Exploration (also known as Voyages of Discovery and Christoph Kolumbus in Germany) is a simulation strategy game designed by Software 2000 in 1994.

Reception

Computer Game Review was unimpressed with the game, writing, "For a game called Exploration, there's really not a whole lot to explore." William R. Trotter of PC Gamer US was more positive: there is "nothing new here, but if you haven't burned out on colonization games, it's a good time", he wrote.

References

External links

1994 video games
Amiga games
DOS games
Historical simulation games
Multiplayer and single-player video games
Naval video games
Software 2000 games
Video games developed in Germany